World Blind Cricket Council (WBCC) is an administration of blind cricket to manage it at international level. The WBC was established in September 1996 when a meeting held in Delhi, India to promote and control the blind cricket globally. George Abraham is the founding chairman of WBC.

Full members 
WBCC  has ten full members this time and the list of full members of WBCC is below.
 Australia
 Bangladesh
 England
 India - (CABI)
 Nepal
 New Zealand
 Pakistan - (PBCC)
 South Africa
 Sri Lanka
 West Indies

Current office bearers 
The elections of the Executive Committee of World Blind Cricket (WBC) held on 29 November 2012 in the Annual General Meeting of World Blind Cricket  at Moevenpick Hotel Bangalore India. The respective office Bearers of World Blind Cricket were elected for the term of next two years.

 Syed Sultan Shah (Pakistan); President WBC
 Mahantesh G.K (India); First Vice President
 Small Allan (South Africa); Second Vice President
 Raymond Moxly (Australia); Secretary General
 Armand Bam (South Africa); Director Technical
 Peter Sugg (England); Director Finance
 Rory Field (England); Director Global Development
 Nagesh S.P (India); Director PR & Fund Raising.

Committee 
 Peter Donovan (Chairman)
 Tim Guttridge (Vice Chairman)
 Geoff Smith (Secretary General)
 Alistair Symondsen (Development and Sponsorship)
 Murli Ranganathan (Tresurer)

Chairmen of WBC 
 George Abraham (Founder and chairman) 1996 - 2004
 Peter Donovan (Chairman) 2004 – present

References

External links 
 

Blind cricket administration
Parasports organizations
Sports organizations established in 1996
1996 establishments in India
Organisations based in Bangalore